Class40 is a class of monohull sailboat and a yacht primarily used for short handed offshore and coastal racing. The class is administered by International Class40 Association which is recognised by the World Sailing.

Background
In 2004 former Vendee Globe and Whitbread competitor, Patrice Carpentier, brought together designers, builders and sailors to formulate a new accessible class of shorthanded offshore racing boats. Now with more than 160 boats, the Class has become the most successful offshore racing class. The class is not to be confused with the Open 40 which in many ways led the way to this class.

The "Class40" can be designed by anyone provided the boat fits within the measurement rule defined. This rule takes the form of a box rule.

The association is responsible for defining and updating the class rules for the boats, and has the additional aims of co-ordinating events.

Class 40 monohulls outnumbered all other boat classes during their first appearance in the 2006 Route du Rhum, with 25 boats registered.

The Class 40 monohulls are high-performance racing boats, designed principally for single-handed or small crew offshore competition.

Class 40 monohulls sit in size between boats the small offshore classes of the Classe Mini and Beneteau Figaro 3 and the pinnacle class the IMOCA 60.

Single and double-handed sailing represents a rapidly growing sector of the sport of sailing. The Class 40 is a cheaper boat that can be sailed competitively in a range of conditions either short handed, by two people, or a solo sailor.

The class is active in Europe, but growing in North America. Boats are built on a semi-production or custom basis.  The class rules though work to keep the boat affordable, limiting exotic materials and equipment seen in high end offshore boats such as the IMOCA 60.

Though some boats are sailed by pro sailors, the amateur class continues to grow as sailors look for the next challenge in offshore sailing.

Events

Class Starts - Oceanic Races
 Route du Rhum Solo Transatlantic Race starting in France 
 Transat Jacques Vabre Two Person Transatlantic Race starting in France 
 Globe 40 Race Two Person Stopping Round the World Race

World Championships

Other Events with Class Starts
 Atlantic Cup Charleston-New York-Newport May Bi-Annually
 Rolex Fastnet Race

Other Events
The class has had numerous success in most of the prestigious offshore events.

The records
These records are usually calculated by race directions but not endorsed by the World Sailing Speed Record Council.

24 Hours Distance

Non-Stop Round Britain and Ireland

References

External links
 Official web site of the International Class 40 association
 North American Official web site of the North American Class 40 association
 World Sailing Class 40 Microsite
 Charter – Express 40 offshore racing yacht
 - Akilaria.fr - Official French website for the Akilaria Class 40 monohull
 - Owen Clarke Design - Designers of custom and semi custom Class 40's, of which three sailing are racing in the USA, including the 2008 Class 40 world champion, 40 Degrees.

Sailing yachts
Single-handed sailing
Classes of World Sailing
Box rule sailing classes